Athis therapon is a moth in the family Castniidae. It is found in Brazil. It was once introduced to New Jersey.

The larvae are a minor pest of Orchidaceae.

References

Moths described in 1839
Castniidae
Fauna of Brazil
Moths of South America